Balmoral Cemetery may refer to:

 Balmoral Cemetery, Belfast, Northern Ireland
 Balmoral Cemetery, Brisbane, Queensland, Australia